κ Phoenicis, Latinized as Kappa Phoenicis, is a single star in the southern constellation of Phoenix. It is visible to the naked eye as a white-hued point of light with an apparent visual magnitude of 3.94. The distance to this star is approximately 77.7 light years based on parallax, and it is drifting further away with a radial velocity of +11 km/s. It is a member of the Castor Moving Group of co-moving stars.

This object has a stellar classification of A5IVn, which matches the spectrum of an A-type subgiant star with "nebulous" lines due to rapid rotation. It is 348 million years old and is spinning with a projected rotational velocity of 245 km/s. The star has 1.7 times the mass of the Sun and 2.0 times the Sun's radius. It is radiating 10.7 times the luminosity of the Sun from its photosphere at an effective temperature of 7,320 K. The star displays an infrared excess that matches the signature of a debris disk orbiting  from the host star with a temperature of 170 K.

References

A-type subgiants
Circumstellar disks
Castor Moving Group

Phoenix (constellation)
Phoenicis, Kappa
Durchmusterung objects
0020
002262
002072
0100